The 1997 UK & Ireland Greyhound Racing Year was the 71st year of greyhound racing in the United Kingdom and Ireland.

Roll of honour

Summary
The National Greyhound Racing Club (NGRC) released the annual returns, with totalisator turnover at £73,754,098 and attendances recorded at 3,523,900 from 5412 meetings.

Some Picture trained by Charlie Lister was voted Greyhound of the Year after winning the 1997 English Greyhound Derby and the 1997 Scottish Greyhound Derby in addition to reaching the 1997 Irish Greyhound Derby final.  The black dog was also voted the leading dog in Ireland and won the Irish Dog of the Year and only just missed out on a £100,000 bonus prize offered by sponsors Regal to any greyhound winning the Scottish, English and Irish Derby.

Linda Mullins won the Greyhound Trainer of the Year for the second successive year.

Tracks
The year started badly when on 4 January the London Stadium closed its doors. The stadium had been rebuilt had huge cost and was now subject to rumours of fraud and malpractice. The reasons for administration was subject to investigation and even appeared on 'The Cook Report', a popular TV show hosted by Roger Cook.

On 27 October Eastville Stadium owned by the BS Group was sold for development, plans were announced for a new Bristol greyhound stadium that never came to fruition. The BS Group management switched the entire operation, including trainers, racing office staff and bookmakers forty miles up the M4 to the newly acquired Swindon, bought from British Car Auctions who had owned the track since 1983, even the Bookmakers Afternoon Greyhound Service (BAGS) contract switched to Swindon. Bristol trainers Terry Kibble, Ron Dix, Marjorie Millard and Peter Swadden all moved Swindon.

The racing ended at Dunmore Stadium in March 1997 and the last meeting attracted 3,000 patrons.

News
Catford Racing Manager Jim Snowden left to be General Manager at Portsmouth replacing the retiring Bill Francis. Snowden was replaced by the Assistant Racing Manager Phil Donaldson. In Wimbledon the Merton council produced a feasibility study into putting a football stadium on Wimbledon Stadium which was dismissed by Wimbledon chairman Sam Hammam. A first season trainer called Seamus Cahill joined Catford.

Competitions
The BBC severed their ties with greyhound racing as they continued to cut their sporting programs. Sky stepped in and would show the TV Trophy for the first time which led to the bizarre scenario whereby the event was held twice; once in April (BBC) and then again in October (Sky). The relationship with Sky was closely guarded by the Greyhound Racing Association who gained the upper hand in negotiations for the industry.

Derby semi-finalist Toms The Best hit a great run of form in the summer winning the Midland Gold Cup at Monmore and the Sussex Cup at Hove before heading for the Irish Derby and claiming the competition for Nick Savva.

Spring Rose continued to perform well, reaching the Grand Prix final at Walthamstow and St Leger final at Wembley but she was upstaged by Tralee Crazy. The white and black bitch trained by Nick Savva won both the Cesarewitch at Catford and the St Leger.

Sheffield (71 points) won the Red Mills Supertrack defeating Walthamstow (64) and Midlenhall (54) in the final.

Principal UK races

Totalisator returns

The totalisator returns declared to the National Greyhound Racing Club for the year 1997 are listed below.

References 

Greyhound racing in the United Kingdom
Greyhound racing in the Republic of Ireland
UK and Ireland Greyhound Racing Year
UK and Ireland Greyhound Racing Year
UK and Ireland Greyhound Racing Year
UK and Ireland Greyhound Racing Year